The following is a list of notable events that are related to Vietnamese music in 2016.

Events

Deaths
March 17 - Trần Lập, 42, rock singer, 42 (colorectal cancer)

References

Vietnam
2016 in Vietnam